Robert Francis Mone (born 1948) is a Scottish murderer who was sentenced to life imprisonment in 1977. In 1967 he shot a teacher at his old school, and in 1976 he and another man escaped from the State Hospital, Carstairs, killing three people in the process. He is Scotland's longest-serving prisoner.

Early life

Mone was born in Dundee and grew up with his parents and two sisters. He was bullied by his father and claims to have been raped by a family friend when he was 12. He became depressed when his grandfather died and lived with his grandmother for a while. In 1964, he was expelled from St John's High School. He then joined the Gordon Highlanders and served in the British Army of the Rhine in Germany.

Murder of Nanette Hanson
On 1 November 1967 Mone, who was absent without leave from his army unit, and had been drinking for days, entered a girls' needlework class at St John's wearing his uniform and armed with a shotgun.  He held the 14- and 15-year-old pupils and their pregnant teacher, Nanette Hanson, captive for 90 minutes. He requested that an acquaintance - 18-year-old nurse Marion Young - be brought to the school. During the standoff, Mone raped one girl, sexually assaulted another, and shot at both women, but the gun misfired. Police brought Mone's grandmother who unsuccessfully asked him to stop. In 2017 a retired police officer claimed that a police sniper had Mone in his sights but was denied permission to shoot. Young and Hanson persuaded Mone to release the girls, but before giving himself up he shot Hanson in the back. She later died in hospital. On 23 January 1968 Mone was found to be insane and sent to the State Hospital in Carstairs. Young was awarded the George Medal and Hanson was posthumously awarded the Albert Medal. Mone's motive is assumed to be revenge for his expulsion from the school.

Escape from Carstairs
On 30 November 1976, Mone broke out of Carstairs with his lover and fellow patient Thomas McCulloch, who had shot and wounded two employees at a restaurant in a dispute about getting too little butter for his roll. The two had planned the escape for six months and had assembled a rope ladder, weapons, fake ID and cash. They killed another patient, Ian Simpson, and a nursing officer, Neil McLellan, then climbed a barbed wire fence. They then killed a police officer, Constable George Taylor and stole his panda car. Hospital authorities took 40 minutes to raise the alarm. Mone and McCulloch were captured near Carlisle in northern England, having changed to an Austin, after a high-speed chase down the A74. Four Scottish police vehicles were joined by reinforcements from Cumbria Constabulary, and they forced the fugitives onto a slip road of the M6 motorway where they crashed. Despite the police presence, they tried to seize a car that had stopped at the crash, before being restrained by police, three of whom were awarded the Queen's Gallantry Medal.

Prison
In early 1977 Mone pleaded guilty to the murder of Taylor, and McCulloch to all three murders. They were imprisoned for life, with a recommendation from Lord Dunpark that they never be released, on 31 March. In May 1981, Mone mounted a rooftop protest at his conditions in HMP Perth.

Mone's father, Robert Christopher "Sonny" Mone, murdered his aunt and two other women in Dundee after his son's conviction. In 1983,  years into his life sentence, Robert Mone was stabbed to death in Craiginches Prison by a fellow inmate.

Mone had six months added to his sentence in 1995 for assaulting a fellow prisoner. In 2002 his sentence was reduced to 25 years under the provisions of the European Convention on Human Rights (ECHR). In 2007, when he was allowed out on day release survivors of the 1967 incident, and politicians Jim McGovern and David McLetchie, argued that Mone should never be released, with McLetchie saying that the ECHR had "crippled the justice system". He was sent back to high security in Glenochil Prison in 2008 following fears that he was planning another escape. McCulloch was released in 2013, but Mone remains in prison. While there, he has studied law and philosophy, and transcribed books into Braille. He is Scotland's longest-serving prisoner.

See also
Sharon Carr – British murderer who repeatedly stabbed a pupil at her school in 1994
List of attacks related to secondary schools
List of serial killers in the United Kingdom
List of serial killers by number of victims

References
Citations

Bibliography

1948 births
1967 murders in the United Kingdom
1976 murders in the United Kingdom
1995 crimes in the United Kingdom
20th-century Scottish criminals
Gordon Highlanders soldiers
Living people
People acquitted by reason of insanity
People detained in hospitals in the United Kingdom
People from Dundee
Scottish escapees
Scottish spree killers
Prisoners sentenced to life imprisonment by Scotland
Scottish rapists
School killings in the United Kingdom